Bordeianu is a Romanian surname. Notable people with the surname include:

 Dan Bordeianu (born 1975), Romanian actor and singer
 Mihai Bordeianu (born 1991), Romanian footballer
 Stelian Bordeianu (born 1968), Romanian footballer
 Teodor Bordeianu (1902–1969), Romanian agronomist

Romanian-language surnames